It Still Rains in Memphis is the fifteenth studio album by American country music artist T. G. Sheppard. It was released in 1986 via Columbia Records. The includes the singles "Strong Heart", "Half Past Forever (Till I'm Blue in the Heart)" and "You're My First Lady"

Track listing

Chart performance

References

1986 albums
T. G. Sheppard albums
Columbia Records albums